The 1936 Balkan Cup was the seventh Balkan Cup football tournament. The national teams of Greece, Bulgaria and Romania took part and it was won by Romania, also host of the tournament. The top goalscorer was Sándor Schwartz from Romania with 4 goals.

Final table

Matches

Winner

Statistics

Goalscorers

References 

1936
1935–36 in European football
1935–36 in Romanian football
1935–36 in Bulgarian football
1935–36 in Greek football